Ahaetulla, commonly referred to as Asian vine snakes or Asian whip snakes, is a genus of colubrid snakes distributed throughout tropical Asia. They are considered by some scientists to be mildly venomous and are what is commonly termed as 'rear-fanged' or more appropriately, opisthoglyphous, meaning their enlarged teeth or fangs, intended to aid in venom delivery, are located in the back of the upper jaw, instead of in the front as they are in vipers or cobras. As colubrids, Ahaetulla do not possess a true venom gland or a sophisticated venom delivery system. The Duvernoy's gland of this genus, homologous to the venom gland of true venomous snakes, produces a secretion which, though not well studied, is considered not to be medically significant to humans. 

Green-colored members of this genus are often referred to as green vine snakes. They are not to be confused with the "green vine snake" Oxybelis fulgidus, which convergently appears very similar but is found in Central and South America.

Taxonomy 
Their closest relative is the monotypic genus Proahaetulla, which Ahaetulla diverged from in the mid-Oligocene. From here, the clade containing Proahaetulla and Ahaetulla is a sister group to the genus Dryophiops, and the clade containing all three of these genera is a sister group to the clade containing the bronzeback snakes (Dendrelaphis) and flying snakes (Chrysopelea). 

In 2020, an analysis of Ahaetulla nasuta, Ahaetulla dispar, and Ahaetulla pulverulenta throughout their range found them to represent species complexes containing several undescribed or formerly synonymized species, leading to the description of A. borealis, A. farnsworthi, A. malabarica, A. travancorica, and A. sahyadrensis, as well as the resurrection of A. oxyrhyncha and A. isabellina. Ahaetulla nasuta and Ahaetulla pulverulenta, formerly considered to have much wider ranges, are now considered endemic to Sri Lanka.

Geographic range 
They are found from Sri Lanka and India to China and much of Southeast Asia. Sri Lanka and the Western Ghats of India are major hotspots of diversity for the genus, with 10 of the 17 currently-described species being endemic to these regions.

Species 
The taxonomy of vine snakes is not well-documented, and literature varies widely, but there are 18 currently accepted species in the genus Ahaetulla:

Ahaetulla anomala (Annandale, 1906) - Variable colored vine snake (possibly conspecific with A. oxyrhyncha)
Ahaetulla borealis Mallik, Srikanthan, Pal, Princia D'Souza, Shanker & Ganesh, 2020 - Northern Western Ghats vine snake
Ahaetulla dispar (Günther, 1864) - Günther's vine snake 
 Ahaetulla farnsworthi Mallik, Srikanthan, Pal, Princia D'Souza, Shanker & Ganesh, 2020 - Farnsworth's vine snake
Ahaetulla fasciolata (Fischer, 1885) - Speckle-headed whipsnake
Ahaetulla flavescens (Wall, 1910 - yellow whipsnake
Ahaetulla fronticincta (Günther, 1858) - Burmese vine snake
Ahaetulla fusca (Duméril, Bibron, & Duméril,1854) - dark whipsnake
Ahaetulla isabellina (Wall, 1910) - Wall's vine snake
Ahaetulla laudankia Deepak, Narayanan, Sarkar, Dutta & Mohapatra, 2019 - Laudankia vine snake
Ahaetulla malabarica Mallik, Srikanthan, Pal, Princia D'Souza, Shanker & Ganesh, 2020 - Malabar vine snake
Ahaetulla mycterizans (Linnaeus, 1758) - Malayan green whipsnake
Ahaetulla nasuta (Lacépède, 1789) - Sri Lankan green vine snake
Ahaetulla oxyrhyncha (Bell, 1825) - Indian vine snake
Ahaetulla perroteti (Duméril & Bibron, 1854) - Nilgiri vine snake
Ahaetulla prasina (Boie, 1827) - Oriental whipsnake or Asian vine snake
Ahaetulla prasina prasina (Boie, 1827)
Ahaetulla prasina medioxima Lazell, 2002
Ahaetulla prasina preocularis (Taylor, 1922)
Ahaetulla prasina suluensis Gaulke, 1994
Ahaetulla pulverulenta (Duméril & Bibron, 1854) - Brown-speckled whipsnake
Ahaetulla rufusoculara Lam, Thu, Nguyen, Murphy, & Nguyen, 2021 
Ahaetulla sahyadrensis Mallik, Srikanthan, Pal, Princia D'Souza, Shanker & Ganesh, 2020
Ahaetulla travancorica Mallik, Srikanthan, Pal, Princia D'Souza, Shanker & Ganesh, 2020 - Travancore vine snake
Several undescribed species (including the Southeast Asian Ahaetulla formerly assigned to A. nasuta) still likely remain in these complexes

Description 
All Ahaetulla species are characterized by thin, elongated bodies, with extremely long tails and a sharply triangular shaped head. They are primarily green in color, but can vary quite a bit to yellows, oranges, greys, and browns. They can have black and/or white patterning, or can be solid in color. Their eyes are almost unique in the reptile world, having keen binocular vision and keyhole shaped pupils, being similar in this aspect with twig snakes, who also have keyhole shaped pupils.

Etymology
The genus name Ahaetulla comes from the Sinhalese name ehetulla for Ahaetulla nasuta, which means 'eye plucker' or 'eye striker.

Vernacular names 
The Sinhala name "" or "eye-plucker" forms the taxonomic genus name. There are dozens of other vernacular names for this snake genus within its range.

 Sinhala: ඇහැටුල්ලා (Pronounced: Aheatulla)
 Telugu: పచ్చారి పాము.
 Bengali: লাউডগা.
 Odia: ଲାଉଡଙ୍କିଆ
 Kannada: ಹಸಿರು ಹಾವು, ಹಸಿರು ಬಳ್ಳಿ ಹಾವು.
 Gujarati: લીલવણ, માળણ.
 Marathi हरणटोळ, शेलाटी
 Tamil: பச்சை பாம்பு
 Malayalam: പച്ചില പാമ്പ്,കൺകൊത്തി
 Telugu: పసరికా పాము

Behavior 
They are primarily diurnal and arboreal, living in humid rainforests. Their diet consists mainly of lizards, but sometimes frogs and rodents are also consumed. Ahaetulla fronticincta, however, feeds exclusively on fish, striking its prey from branches overhanging water. Ahaetulla venom is not considered to be dangerous to humans, but serves to cause paralysis in their fast moving prey choices. They are ovoviviparous.

In captivity 
Ahaetulla species are not yet frequently captive bred, as are many of the more popular snakes in the reptile keeping hobby. They are suitable for more advanced keepers, requiring a humid arboreal habitat and a diet of lizards as they rarely switch to rodents. Without proper husbandry, they are prone to health issues and stress.

References

External links 

Ecology Asia, Snakes of Southeast Asia: Oriental Whip Snake
Dr. Zoltan Takacs' Homebase

Ahaetulla
Snakes of India
Reptiles of China
Reptiles of Sri Lanka
Snake genera